Teerath Nakchamnarn (born May 25, 1986), or Chayoot Nakchamnarn ( is a Thai professional footballer who plays as a goalkeeper for Thai League 2 club Customs United.

Club career

Honours

Club
Ratchaburi
 Thai Division 1 League: 2012
Chainat Hornbill
 Thai League 2: 2017
Nongbua Pitchaya
 Thai League 2: 2020–21

References

External links
 Profile at Goal

1986 births
Living people
Teerath Nakchamnarn
Teerath Nakchamnarn
Association football goalkeepers
Teerath Nakchamnarn
Teerath Nakchamnarn
Teerath Nakchamnarn
Teerath Nakchamnarn
Teerath Nakchamnarn
Teerath Nakchamnarn
Teerath Nakchamnarn